Veronicastroside (identical to Lonicerin) is a flavone, a type of flavonoid. It is the 7-O-neohesperidoside of luteolin. It can be found in Veronicastrum sibiricum var. japonicum and in Teucrium gnaphalodes.

References 

Flavones
Flavone glycosides